In Greek mythology, Rhoeteia (Ancient Greek: Ῥοιτείαa Rhoiteia) was the name which can be attributed to two distinct women who gave their name to the Trojan promontory of Rhoeteium. These two are might be related by blood. 

 Rhoeteia, a Thracian princess as daughter of the King Sithon and the naiad Achiroe. She was a sister of Pallene.
 Rhoiteia, a daughter of the sea-god Proteus. Her possible mother was princess Torone (Chrysonoe), daughter of King Cleitus of Sithonia and Pallene, the sister of the above Rhoeteia.

Notes

References 

 Conon, Fifty Narrations, surviving as one-paragraph summaries in the Bibliotheca (Library) of Photius, Patriarch of Constantinople translated from the Greek by Brady Kiesling. Online version at the Topos Text Project.
 Stephanus of Byzantium, Stephani Byzantii Ethnicorum quae supersunt, edited by August Meineike (1790–1870), published 1849. A few entries from this important ancient handbook of place names have been translated by Brady Kiesling. Online version at the Topos Text Project.

Princesses in Greek mythology
Mythological Thracian women
Greek mythology of Thrace